Elmar Geirsson (born 25 July 1948) is an Icelandic former professional footballer who played as a midfielder.

Club career
Geirsson started at Fram and later was successful in Germany with Hertha Zehlendorf and SV Eintracht Trier 05.

International career
He made his debut for Iceland in 1967 and went on to win 23 caps, scoring two goals.

References

1948 births
Living people
Elmar Geirsson
Elmar Geirsson
Elmar Geirsson
SV Eintracht Trier 05 players
Expatriate footballers in Germany
2. Bundesliga players
Association football midfielders